Petersfield was an English Parliamentary constituency centred on the town of Petersfield in Hampshire. It existed for several hundred years until its abolition for the 1983 general election.

Until 1832, it returned two Members of Parliament to the House of Commons of the Parliament of the United Kingdom. Thereafter, its representation was reduced to one member until its abolition in 1983.

Boundaries
1885–1918: The Sessional Divisions of Alton, Droxford, and Petersfield, and part of the Sessional Division of Winchester.

1918–1950: The Urban Districts of Alton and Petersfield, and the Rural Districts of Alresford, Alton, Catherington, Droxford, and Petersfield.

1950–1955: The Urban Districts of Alton and Petersfield, the Rural Districts of Alton, Droxford, and Petersfield, and in the Rural District of Winchester the parishes of Botley, Burlesdon, Hamble, Hedge End, Hound, and West End.

1955–1983: The Urban Districts of Alton and Petersfield, and the Rural Districts of Alton, Droxford, and Petersfield.

Members of Parliament

MPs for Petersfield borough (1547-1885)

MPs 1547–1660

MPs 1660–1832

MPs 1832–1885

MPs for Petersfield county constituency (1885–1983)

Elections

Elections in the 1830s

 201 householders voted for the Jolliffes and 148 for Herbert and Ogle, but these were all rejected

On petition, Shaw Lefevre was declared unelected, and Jolliffe was elected.

On petition, Jolliffe was unseated and Hector declared elected.

Elections in the 1840s

Elections in the 1850s

Elections in the 1860s

Jolliffee was elevated to the peerage, becoming 1st Baron Hylton and causing a by-election.

Elections in the 1870s

Elections in the 1880s

Elections in the 1890s

Elections in the 1900s

Elections in the 1910s

Elections in the 1920s

Elections in the 1930s 

Liberal candidate Gerald Bailey withdrew at the last minute.

General Election 1939–40:

Another General Election was required to take place before the end of 1940. The political parties had been making preparations for an election to take place and by the Autumn of 1939, the following candidates had been selected; 
Conservative: Reginald Dorman-Smith
Liberal: Basil Goldstone
Labour: D Muir Hunter
British Union: Muriel G Whinfield

Elections in the 1940s

Elections in the 1950s

Elections in the 1960s

Elections in the 1970s

References 

Robert Beatson, (London: Longman, Hurst, Res & Orme, 1807) A Chronological Register of Both Houses of Parliament Google Books

Petersfield
Parliamentary constituencies in Hampshire (historic)
Constituencies of the Parliament of the United Kingdom established in 1547
Constituencies of the Parliament of the United Kingdom disestablished in 1983